The First National Bank Building in Highland, Kansas was built in 1913.  It is located at 422-424 West Main St.  It was listed on the National Register of Historic Places in 2008.  It has also been known as the Highland Post Office Building.

References

Bank buildings on the National Register of Historic Places in Kansas
Early Commercial architecture in the United States
Buildings and structures completed in 1913
Doniphan County, Kansas